Martin Fischer-Dieskau (born 1954) is a German conductor.

Early life 

Fischer-Dieskau was born in Berlin to a musical family; his father was the singer Dietrich Fischer-Dieskau, his mother was the cellist Irmgard Poppen. Fischer-Dieskau's older brother, Mathias, is a highly regarded stage designer, and his younger brother Manuel Fischer-Dieskau is a cellist. Fischer-Dieskau claims that his desire to be a conductor dates from 1961, when he and his older brother visited a rehearsal of Don Giovanni at the Deutsche Oper Berlin, in which his father was starring.

Education 

Fischer-Dieskau studied conducting, violin and piano at the Hochschule für Musik in Vienna, the Hochschule der Künste in Berlin and the Accademia Chigiana di Siena. He participated in masterclasses with Franco Ferrara, Seiji Ozawa and Leonard Bernstein. From 1976 to 1977 he was a laureate in the German Music League's National Selection of Young Artists, and in 1978 and 1988 was awarded scholarships by the Leonard Bernstein Fellowship Program at Tanglewood. He also received a Magister degree in Italian Literature and Musicology from the Freie Universität Berlin. Publications: Wagner&Verdi, Kulturen der Oper  Böhlau Verlag, Köln 2014. In 2015 ensued the PhD graduation with a dissertation about "Conducting in the Nineteenth Century - Italy's special path".

Musical career 

In the 1978/79 season, he was assistant conductor to Antal Doráti at the Detroit Symphony Orchestra. After positions in Augsburg, Aachen and Hagen, Fischer-Dieskau became principal conductor at Theater Bern in 1991 with responsibilities for the contemporary, Italian and Russian repertory. He was guest conductor at festivals in Helsinki, Drottningholm, Oviedo and Granada, where he performed in collaboration with celebrity singers such as Ricciarelli, Obraztsova, Aliberti, Seiffert. In 1993 he served as the artistic leader of the Youth Festival at Bayreuth. He has held a professorship in conducting at the University of the Arts Bremen since 1994 and produced and hosted his own television series of eleven musical "tours" that were telecast for ARD throughout Germany. In 2001 he was the initiator of an Israeli-Palestinian-German orchestral summit in Tel Aviv, Israel.

From 1 June 2001 to November 2003, he served as artistic director of the Kitchener-Waterloo Symphony Orchestra in Kitchener, Ontario, Canada. With this orchestra, he inaugurated the first German-Canadian Festival in Toronto.

From 2009-2011, he was the music director of the Taipei Symphony Orchestra.  conducting a wide range of classical and Taiwanese repertoire as well as a fully staged production of Gianni Schicchi and Il segreto di Susanna. The event was accompanied by an international Puccini symposium organized for the Taipei University.

Fischer-Dieskau has travelled extensively across Europe, North America and Asia for professional engagements, including with the Berlin Philharmonic, Royal Philharmonic, the London Philharmonic, Moscow State Orchestra the Orchestre National de France, the NHK Tokyo, the Tokyo Philharmonic and the New Japan Philharmonic. He conducted all of the major orchestras in Germany, Scandinavia and many Italian and Spanish orchestras in a total of more than 100 worldwide.

In opera - on top of holding positions with the Augsburg, Hagen, Aachen and Bern theaters -  he worked for Opera North, the Württemberg State Opera Stuttgart, the San Carlo in Naples, the Regio in Turin, the Minnesota Opera and a number of Spanish opera companies.

Recordings
Concert for Lidice (BIS-CD-578), Czech Philharmonic Orchestra, New Berlin Chamber Orchestra
Humperdinck: Moorish Rhapsody/Sleeping Beauty (Naxos 8.223369), Slovak Radio Symphony Orchestra 
Furtwängler: Te Deum, Hindemith: Mathis der Maler Symphony, Berlin Rundfunk-Symphonieorchester, IPPNW concerts.
Antal Doráti: DER KÜNDER world premiere recording, Konieczny, Schade, Frenkel, Beethoven Academy Orchestra Cracow, ORFEO/NAXOS

References 
  http://www.martinfischer-dieskau-presskit.com
https://www.schmidtart.com/artists/martin_fischer_dieskau
 TSO Announces Crucial Appointment, Taipei Times, January 11, 2008
https://www.rondomagazin.de/artikel.php?artikel_id=3477&teaser=true
https://onlinemerker.com/cd-antal-dorati-der-kuender-oper-in-drei-akten-nach-dem-mysterienspiel-elija-von-martin-buber-orfeo/
https://klassik-begeistert.de/martin-fischer-dieskau-nicht-jeder-der-einen-taktstock-zur-hand-nimmt-ist-deshalb-schon-dirigent-teil-4-klassik-begeistert-de/
https://bachtrack.com/interview-martin-fischer-dieskau-conductor-july-2019
https://www.european-cultural-news.com/de/tag/martin-fischer-dieskau/

1954 births
Living people
German male conductors (music)
Accademia Musicale Chigiana alumni
21st-century German conductors (music)
21st-century German male musicians